The Trinity Railway Express (TRE) is a commuter rail line in the Dallas–Fort Worth metroplex. It was established by an interlocal agreement between Dallas Area Rapid Transit (DART) and Trinity Metro. Each transit authority owns a 50% stake in the joint rail project and contractor Herzog Transit Services operates the line. The TRE began operating in December 1996.

Before 2006, the TRE was typically shown as a green line on DART maps and therefore was sometimes referred to as the "Green Line," but this was not an official designation. Since 2006, the TRE has been shown as a dark blue line on DART maps.

History 
Named after the Trinity River, the West Fork of which flows from Fort Worth to Dallas, the TRE was launched on December 30, 1996, shortly after the inaugural service of Dallas' DART Light Rail system, operating from Dallas Union Transit Station to the South Irving Transit Station. It runs along a former Chicago, Rock Island & Pacific Railroad line that the cities of Dallas and Fort Worth purchased in 1983 for $34 million.

Service initially operated only in weekday rush hours, but midday and evening service was added in December 1997, and Saturday service was added in December 1998.

On September 18, 2000, the line was extended to the suburb of Richland Hills and, for the first time, there was rail service available between downtown Dallas and Dallas/Fort Worth International Airport. On November 13, 2000, the West Irving Transit Station also opened. On December 3, 2001, the TRE was extended to its current terminus at the T&P Station in downtown Fort Worth.

Route 
The eastern terminus of the TRE line is Dallas Union Station on the west side of downtown Dallas. The line runs northwest, past the American Airlines Center and Southwestern Medical Center, through Irving, Dallas/Fort Worth International Airport, Hurst, and Richland Hills before ending with two stops in downtown Fort Worth (Fort Worth Central Station at 9th and Jones Streets and T&P Station on Throckmorton Street). There are a total of ten regular station stops, including a stop at Victory station (which until the opening of DART's Green line in September 2009, was used only for special events). Not all trains are through trains – a number of trains either terminate or originate at the CentrePort/DFW Airport station.

Rolling Stock

Diesel locomotives 
TRE has a fleet of 11 locomotives.

 EMD F59PH IV (1994)
There are seven EMD F59PH IV locomotives that were acquired from GO Transit.  The original numbers for these were #525, #527–528 and #565–568.
These were overhauled in late 2010 by the Norfolk Southern Railway and RELCO Locomotive to meet EPA standards and renumbered 120–126.

 EMD F59PHI (2001)
There are two EMD F59PHI locomotives that were purchased from EMD. The numbers for these are #569 and #570.

 EMD F40PH (2022)
TRE acquired 2 F40PHs from Progress Rail in 2022. They are numbered 130 and 131.

Coaches 
 Bombardier Transportation and Hawker Siddeley bi-level cabs and coaches

Former fleet 
Until 2011, the TRE fleet included diesel multiple units, in the form of 13 Budd Rail Diesel Cars (RDCs) built in the 1950s for Canadian Pacific (9), Canadian National (3) and Boston & Maine (1). They were purchased used from Via Rail Canada in 1993. All were remanufactured by GEC-Alsthom in Montreal. They entered service in March and April 1997after trains leased from Amtrak and the Connecticut Department of Transportation temporarily provided initial TRE service when the RDCs were not ready in time for the inauguration of TRE service in December 1996and thereafter provided all service for the line's first two to three years. They remained in service for about 14 years, the last cars being taken off of TRE service in March 2011. In 2010–2011, 11 of the 13 cars were leased to Denton County Transportation Authority for operation on the A-train. They were returned in 2012 and placed in storage at the TRE shops in Irving, Texas.  In spring 2017, 12 RDCs were sold via auction to AllEarth Rail, a Vermont-based private company that intends to use them to operate commuter rail service connecting the Vermont cities of Montpelier and Burlington. AllEarth subsequently resold two of the TRE cars to TriMet, of Portland, Oregon, before they had left Texas, and those two Dallas RDCs (Nos. 2007 and 2011) were moved in August 2017 from Texas to Oregon, where TriMet planned to use them on its WES Commuter Rail service. The other 10 RDCs were moved to Vermont the same month.

Train consist 

Each train includes at least one locomotive unit and one bi-level cab car. Typically, one or two additional coach cars are included between the locomotive and cab car.  Each cab car (and thus each train) has a restroom and passengers may move between cars during the trip. The trip from Union Station to T&P Station takes just over an hour, with scheduled trip times ranging from one hour, three minutes to one hour, eleven minutes. Track improvements are currently underway which should offer an improvement in travel times by double-tracking certain stations and sections of the route. Currently, portions of the route are single-track, requiring eastbound and westbound trains to meet only at certain points and requiring some eastbound trains to hold for 5–7 minutes to wait for a westbound train to get to the passing area.

Stations

Gallery

References

External links 

 
 

 
Dallas Area Rapid Transit
Transportation in Fort Worth, Texas
Texas railroads
Railway services introduced in 1996
Commuter rail in the United States
Passenger rail transportation in Texas
Transportation in the Dallas–Fort Worth metroplex
Standard gauge railways in the United States
Joint ventures
1996 establishments in Texas
Transportation in Irving, Texas
Rail transportation in Dallas